Aechmea lasseri is a plant species in the genus Aechmea. This species is endemic to Venezuela.

Cultivars
 Aechmea 'Pink Dusty'
 × Billmea 'Lazslo'
 × Quesmea 'QA-1'

References

BSI Cultivar Registry Retrieved 11 October 2009

lasseri
Flora of Venezuela